Stanulus talboti, Talbot's blenny, is a species of combtooth blenny  found in coral reefs in the western Pacific Ocean. This species feeds primarily on plants, including benthic algae and weeds.  This species can reach  in TL.  This fish is also found in the aquarium trade.

Description
A small fish, with maximum recorded size of about 4.8 cm. Small unbranched supraorbital, nasal and nuchal cirri. Lip margins smooth. Deep notch in dorsal fin between spiny and rayed sections, dorsal fin attached to base of caudal peduncle by a membrane, anal fin free. There is a stripe of dark brown spots along the body. Above this stripe the back is brown with whitish spots, and the belly is whitish. The underside of the head has small white spots, and there is a dark brown spot at the base of the pectoral fin.

Distribution
Recorded from Western Australia, the southern part of the Great Barrier Reef, Lord Howe Island, the Ryukyu Islands and the Ogasawara Islands, east into the Pacific as far as Tonga. The type locality is One Tree Island in the Capricorn Group on the Great Barrier Reef.

Habitat
Usually seen in the surge channels of exposed reefs at depths from 3 to 15m.

Name
The specific name honours Frank Talbot of the South African Museum who organised the expedition on which the type was collected and who helped collect it.

References

talboti
Fish described in 1968
Taxa named by Victor G. Springer